Bernard Jones may refer to:

 Bernard Jones (footballer, born 1924) (1924–2000), English footballer who played for Port Vale
 Bernard Jones (footballer, born 1934), English footballer who played for Northampton Town, Cardiff City and Shrewsbury Town
 Bernard Mouat Jones (1882–1953), chemist
 Bernard M. Jones (born 1979), United States magistrate judge